Maa Shakumbhari University is a state university in Saharanpur, Uttar Pradesh, India that is scheduled to open in 2022.

Construction commenced by 2021 after the university was established under The Uttar Pradesh State Universities (Amendment) Act, 2019. It was originally called Saharanpur State University until it was renamed in August 2021(established by Uttar Pradesh Act no. 6 of 2019 and renamed by Uttar Pradesh Act no. 19 of 2021).

It will establish by upgrading Government Degree College, Punwarka (established in 1999) and affiliate all government and private degree colleges in the districts of Saharanpur, Muzaffarnagar and Shamli who were affiliated with Chaudhary Charan Singh University.

References

External links
Website

Universities in Uttar Pradesh
Education in Saharanpur
Unaccredited institutions of higher learning in India